Jack Leon Paradise (1925 – December 20, 2021) was a pediatrician, pediatric primary care researcher, and professor emeritus of pediatrics at University of Pittsburgh School of Medicine.

Research
Paradise asserts that the common fear of developmental problems caused by persistent ear infections in children are unfounded. According to Paradise's research, for children up to 3 years old, "ear disease does not cause any developmental problems." The research asserts that if the insertion of tympanostomy tubes into a child's ear is delayed, there is "no effect on a child's performance on language tests and speech tests."

In otherwise healthy children ages 9 to 11 who have persistent middle-ear effusion, a study led by Paradise concluded that "prompt insertion of tympanostomy tubes does not improve developmental outcomes."

Impact on medical community
According to the UPMC Children's Hospital of Pittsburgh, Paradise's studies have helped to promote the use of strict criteria for tonsillectomy and adenoidectomy. The 78% decline in pediatric tonsillectomies in the United States between 1971 and 1996 has also been largely attributed to his work.

External links
 "Expert Q & A" from the New York Times.
 Biography at UPMC Children's Hospital of Pittsburgh

References

1925 births
2021 deaths
American pediatricians
American otolaryngologists
University of Pittsburgh faculty